is a former Japanese football player and manager. She played for Japan national team.

Playing career
Noda was born in Komae on October 13, 1969. In 1982, she joined Yomiuri Beleza. The club won L.League for 4 years in a row (1990-1993). In 1990 season, she became top scorer with 16 goals and she was selected MVP awards. She was also selected Best Eleven 5 times (1989, 1990, 1991, 1993 and 1994). In 1995, she moved to Takarazuka Bunnys. In 1996, she retired.

National team career
On October 17, 1984, when Noda was 15 years old, she debuted for Japan national team against Italy. She played at 1986, 1989, 1991, 1993, 1995 AFC Championship, 1990 and 1994 Asian Games. She was also a member of Japan for 1991, 1995 World Cup and 1996 Summer Olympics. She played 76 games and scored 24 goals for Japan until 1996.

Coaching career
Following the end of the 2010 L.League Noda was appointed Nippon TV Beleza's manager. She resigned in 2012. In May 2016, she was appointed Iga FC Kunoichi. She managed until end of 2017 season.

National team statistics

References

External links
 
 
 
 
 
 

1969 births
Living people
People from Komae, Tokyo
Association football people from Tokyo Metropolis
Japanese women's footballers
Japan women's international footballers
Nadeshiko League players
Nippon TV Tokyo Verdy Beleza players
Bunnys Kyoto SC players
Japanese women's football managers
Footballers at the 1990 Asian Games
1991 FIFA Women's World Cup players
1995 FIFA Women's World Cup players
Olympic footballers of Japan
Footballers at the 1996 Summer Olympics
Women's association football midfielders
Asian Games medalists in football
Asian Games silver medalists for Japan
Footballers at the 1994 Asian Games
Medalists at the 1990 Asian Games
Medalists at the 1994 Asian Games
Nadeshiko League MVPs